Edward Bradley may refer to:
 Edward Bradley (politician) (1808–1847), U.S Representative from Michigan
 Edward Bradley (writer) (1827–1889), English novelist and clergyman
 Edward Bradley (colonel) (died 1829), colonel in the American Revolution and the War of 1812
 Edward R. Bradley (1859–1946), American businessman, thoroughbred racehorse owner/breeder
 Ed Bradley (1941–2006), CBS news correspondent
 Ed Bradley (linebacker) (born 1950), American football player
 Ed Bradley (guard) (1927–2009), American football guard
 Ed Bradley (politician), member of the Oklahoma Senate (1959–1961, 1965–1973)
 Edward E. Bradley (1845–1917), American military general
 G. Edward Bradley (1906–1993), American optometrist and politician in Massachusetts